The Maury Mountain Forest Reserve was established by the U.S. Forest Service in Oregon on June 2, 1905 with .  On March 2, 1907 the forest was combined with Blue Mountains National Forest and the name was discontinued. The lands are presently divided among several Oregon Forests.

References

External links
Forest History Society
Listing of the National Forests of the United States and Their Dates (from the Forest History Society website) Text from Davis, Richard C., ed. Encyclopedia of American Forest and Conservation History. New York: Macmillan Publishing Company for the Forest History Society, 1983. Vol. II, pp. 743-788.

Former National Forests of Oregon
1905 establishments in Oregon
Protected areas established in 1905
1907 disestablishments in Oregon